The judo competition for men and women at the 2007 Pan American Games was held from July 19 to 22, 2007, in Rio de Janeiro, Brazil. There were seven weight divisions, for both men and women.

Medal table

Men's competition

Extra-lightweight (60 kg)

Half-lightweight (66 kg)

Lightweight (73 kg)

Half-middleweight (81 kg)

Middleweight (90 kg)

Half-heavyweight (100 kg)

Heavyweight (+100 kg)

Women's competition

Extra-lightweight (48 kg)

Half-lightweight (52 kg)

Lightweight (57 kg)

Half-middleweight (63 kg)

Middleweight (70 kg)

Half-heavyweight (78 kg)

Heavyweight (+78 kg)

See also
Judo at the 2008 Summer Olympics

References

External links
 
 Sports 123

2007
Events at the 2007 Pan American Games
American Games
Judo competitions in Brazil
International sports competitions in Rio de Janeiro (city)